Basco is a village in Bear Creek Township, Hancock County, Illinois, United States. The population was 98 at the 2010 census.

Geography 
Basco is located in south-central Hancock County at  (40.3278009, -91.1994949).

Demographics 

As of the census of 2000, there were 107 people, 48 households, and 27 families residing in the village. The racial makeup of the village was 100.00% White.

There were 48 households, out of which 25.0% had children under the age of 18 living with them, 45.8% were married couples living together, 8.3% had a female householder with no husband present, and 43.8% were non-families. 35.4% of all households were made up of individuals, and 22.9% had someone living alone who was 65 years of age or older. The average household size was 2.23 and the average family size was 2.93.

In the village, the population was spread out, with 22.4% under the age of 18, 8.4% from 18 to 24, 30.8% from 25 to 44, 18.7% from 45 to 64, and 19.6% who were 65 years of age or older. The median age was 38 years. For every 100 females, there were 94.5 males. For every 100 females age 18 and over, there were 80.4 males.

The median income for a household in the village was $29,306, and the median income for a family was $58,125. Males had a median income of $34,375 versus $22,188 for females. The per capita income for the village was $16,746. There were 6.1% of families and 9.2% of the population living below the poverty line, including 14.7% of under eighteens and 11.1% of those over 64.

References 

Populated places established in 1886
Villages in Hancock County, Illinois
Villages in Illinois